Michael Cranston is a former Australian public servant who was a deputy commissioner of the Australian Taxation Office (ATO).

Former Deputy Commissioner 

Michael Cranston was an ATO employee for over 40 years, the last period as Deputy Commissioner for Private Groups and High Wealth Individuals.  In this role he was responsible for tax compliance of private group businesses and High Wealth Individuals.  He was also responsible for tax crime including offshore tax evasion, dealing with Project Wickenby and the Panama Papers. Cranston worked on and chaired the OECD Taskforce on Tax Crimes in Paris from 2012 to 2017.

Tax raids 
During 2015, Cranston was the Deputy Commissioner at the time of a major operation which led to 100 tax officers raiding the Sydney premises of 12 firms, including lawyers, accountants and liquidators. Cranston was not directly involved in the operation. The 12 firms were suspected of involvement in phoenix operations, whereby companies run up tax liabilities, fail to pay the tax liabilities, and money or assets disappear or are stripped from the companies before the companies are deliberately bankrupted by the proprietors. The same proprietors then establish new but similar companies, and the whole process is repeated, systematically.  The bankrupted companies are liquidated, with the intention of leaving creditors and the tax office empty-handed or short-changed.

Alleged Plutus Payroll tax fraud 
In 2017, it emerged that Cranston's family, a son Adam and a daughter Lauren, were alleged to be central characters in Australia's alleged largest tax fraud involving phoenixing. The alleged estimated amount of money involved in the fraud, according to the investigating authorities, has been reported in the media at figures ranging from $130 million to $160 million. Parts of the evidence were gathered using phone taps of conversations between the various suspects and phone conversations between two members of the Cranston family.

In May 2017, the police didn't believe Cranston was part of the conspiracy, and it was not believed that Cranston was aware of the fraud, though Cranston did access restricted information. Later in 2017, Cranston resigned from the ATO after he was formally charged with abusing his position as a public servant. Cranston's trial was conducted in January and February 2019. On 15 February 2019, after nearly three weeks on trial before NSW District Court judge Robyn Tupman, a jury took less than six hours deliberation to find the 40-year ATO veteran not guilty of dishonestly obtaining information in his capacity as a senior public servant to benefit Adam Cranston, as well as a charge of using his influence to improperly obtain a benefit for his son.

Partner, Waterhouse Lawyers 
Cranston is now a partner at Waterhouse Tax Lawyers. This firm specialises in providing tax advice and assistance to individuals and businesses. It has a strong focus in dealing with the Australian Taxation Office in relation to debt and audit dispute matters.

References

Australian public servants
Taxation in Australia
Living people
Year of birth missing (living people)
Corruption in Australia